The women's changquan competition at the 2008 Beijing Wushu Tournament was held on August 21 at the Olympic Sports Center Gymnasium.

Schedule 
All times are Beijing Time (UTC+08:00)

Results 
The event was judged with the degree of difficulty component.

References 

Women's_changquan